Kalaba is a town in Nevşehir Province, Turkey.

Geography 
Kalaba is a belde (town) in Avanos district of Nevsehir Province. The population of Kalaba was 4730 as of 2011

History 

Kalaba was founded in 1800s. The former name Karayusuf Höyüğü refers to the founder of the settlement. It was then renamed Kalaba. In 1972 it was declared a seat of township.

Economy 
Major economic activities are agriculture and animal breeding. Main crops are cereals and sunflower. The Nevşehir Cement factory is situated to the east of Kalaba and some town residents work in the factory. Also many Kalaba residents work in West Europe as foreign worker (Gastarbeiter)

References 

Towns in Turkey
Populated places in Nevşehir Province
Avanos